Essie Sakhai (born in Tehran, Iran and educated in Great Britain) is an Iranian businessman and one of the world's foremost experts, collectors and dealers of the ancient Iranian art form of the Persian and Oriental Carpets and Rugs. Born to a family with a long history of dealing in Persian Carpets dating nine generations, he gained much of his knowledge from his father Benayahoo Sakhai. Essie is the founder of Essie Carpets, based in Mayfair London, which holds one of the world's most comprehensive and finest collections of Persian and Oriental carpets and rugs.

Essie is the author of three books in which he shares his extensive knowledge on the subject of Persian and Oriental carpets; The Story of Carpets (1991), Oriental Carpets: A Buyer's Guide (1995), and Persian Rugs and Carpets: The Fabric of Life (2007).

Essie spends most of his time at his galleries situated in London's Mayfair, carrying on the family tradition started in 1766. Essie advises museums, royal families and private collectors.

Books 
Sakhai is the author of three books on carpets:
 1991: The Story of Carpets.
 French language edition: Mysteres des Tapis D'Orient. Paris: Librairie Gründ. .
 1995: Oriental Carpets: A Buyer's Guide. Kingston: Moyer Bell. , . 
 2008: Persian Rugs and Carpets: The Fabric of Life. Antique Collectors Club. , .

References

People from Tehran
Businesspeople from London
Year of birth missing (living people)
Living people
Iranian emigrants to the United Kingdom
Art collectors from London
Persian rugs and carpets
Iranian businesspeople